Georgia-Lithuania relations refers to bilateral relations between Georgia and Lithuania.

History 
Diplomatic relations between Georgia and the Republic of Lithuania were established on 16 September 1994.

On 9 August 2018, Lithuania introduced migration restrictions on individuals placed on the Otkhozoria–Tatunashvili List, a list of individuals the Georgian Parliament considers to have 'violated the rights of Georgian citizens in the Georgian occupied regions of Abkhazia and Tskhinvali'.

In December 2020, Lithuanian Foreign Minister Linas Linkevičius called for NATO to cooperate more closely with Georgia and Ukraine and maintain the 'open door' policy.

On 25 February 2021, in response to the detention of Nika Melia, Ministers of Foreign Affairs of Estonia, Latvia and Lithuania issued a joint statement expressing "serious concerns over the political situation developing in Georgia" and urging "all political forces to act with restraint, de-escalate the situation and seek [a] constructive solution". Lithuanian President Gitanas  Nausėda offered to act as a mediator to resolve the situation.

See also 

 Foreign relations of Georgia
 Foreign relations of Lithuania

References

External links 

 
 

 
Lithuania
Georgia